MoBap may refer to:

 Missouri Baptist University, an educational institution in St. Louis, Missouri
 Missouri Baptist Medical Center, a hospital in St. Louis